Sociedade Esportiva e Recreativa Caxias do Sul, commonly known as Caxias, is a Brazilian professional association football club based in Caxias do Sul, Rio Grande do Sul. The team plays in Série D, the fourth tier of the Brazilian football league system, as well as in the Gauchão Série A, the top tier of the Rio Grande do Sul state football league.

Caxias won the Campeonato Gaúcho – Rio Grande do Sul State Championship in 2000 and lost the 2012 Final to Sport Club Internacional.

Its fiercest rival is Juventude, the other club based in Caxias do Sul. The local derby is known as Ca-Ju. In 2021, Grená is ranked as the 82nd best team in Brazil, according to the Brazilian Football Confederation Ranking.

History
Caxias was founded on April 10, 1935, as Grêmio Esportivo Flamengo, which had been a fusion of two other teams (Ruy Barbosa and Rio Branco). However the club, as well as Juventude folded due to a financial crisis in the 1960s. Both teams merged into Associação Caxias de Futebol on December 14, 1971. Juventude reestablished itself in 1975, and Grêmio Esportivo Flamengo adopted the name Sociedade Esportiva e Recreativa Caxias do Sul. In 1972, Associação Caxias de Futebol and Grêmio played the first game on color TV in Brazil. The game finished 0–0. The club's greatest feat was the 2000 Campeonato Gaúcho title.

Anthem
 Written by: Dirceu Antônio Soares
 Music by: Antônio Messias and Dirceu Antônio Soares

Current squad
As of May 31st, 2020

First-team staff

Stadium

Caxias' stadium is Estádio Centenário, inaugurated in 1976, with a maximum capacity of 30,802 people.

Rivalry
Caxias' biggest rival is Juventude. The game between the two clubs is named CA-JU. The other rival of Caxias is Esportivo of Bento Gonçalves.

Managers

 Levir Culpi (1986)
 Ivo Wortmann (1987)
 Tite (1991–1992)
 Celso Roth (1996)
 Tite (1999–2000)
 Edson Gaúcho (2001)
 Roberto Cavalo (2002)
 Abel Ribeiro (2002)
 Péricles Chamusca (2003)
 Tita (2004)
 Juninho Fonseca (2004)
 Mano Menezes (2004–2005)
 Leandro Machado (2007)
 Gilson Kleina (2007)
 Adilson Fernandes (2008–2009)
 Renê Weber (2009)
 Argel Fucks (2009)
 Gilmar Iser (2009)
 Círio Quadros (2009)
 Julinho Camargo (2010)
 Ricardo Drubscky (2010)
 Lisca (2010–2011)
 Guilherme Macuglia (2011)
 Argel Fucks (2011)
 Luiz Carlos Ferreira (2011)
 Paulo Porto (2012)
 Mauro Ovelha (2012)
 Picoli (2012–2014)
 Beto Campos (2014)
 Itamar Schülle (2014)
 Paulo Turra (2014–2015)
 Hélio dos Anjos (2015)
 Luís Antônio Zaluar (2015)
 Marcelo Vilar (2015)
 Beto Campos (2015–2016)
 Luiz Carlos Winck (2015–)

Honours
 Campeonato Gaúcho
Winners (1): 2000

 Campeonato do Interior Gaúcho
Winners (12): 1969, 1973, 1975, 1977, 1978, 1985, 1989, 1990, 2000, 2010, 2017, 2019

 Campeonato Gaúcho Série A2
Winners (2): 1953, 2016

 Copa FGF
Winners (1): 2007

References

External links
 Official Site
 Arquivo Grená

 
Association football clubs established in 1935
Caxias
1935 establishments in Brazil
Caxias do Sul